Hsu Chieh-kuei (born 1932) is a Taiwanese politician.

He served as director of Chunghwa Post and as head of the Council of Labor Affairs.

References

1932 births
Taiwanese Ministers of Labor
Living people
20th-century Taiwanese politicians